Choristella vitrea is a species of sea snail, a marine gastropod mollusk in the family Choristellidae.

Description
The shell grows to a size of 3.5 mm

Distribution
This species occurs in the Pacific Ocean off Japan.

References

External links
 

Choristellidae
Gastropods described in 1971